This is a list of pine trees of Denmark.

Pinus aristata
Pinus armandii
Pinus attenuata
Pinus banksiana
Pinus cembra
Pinus contorta
Pinus contorta ssp. latifolia
Pinus contorta ssp. murrayana
Pinus coulteri
Pinus densata
Pinus densiflora
Pinus flexilis
Pinus halepensis
Pinus heldreichii 
Pinus hwangshanensis 
Pinus jeffreyi
Pinus koraiensis
Pinus monticola
Pinus mugo
Pinus mugo ssp. uncinata 
Pinus nigra 
Pinus nigra var. caramanica
Pinus nigra ssp. salzmannii
Pinus nigra ssp. salzmannii var. corsicana
Pinus parviflora
Pinus peuce
Pinus pinaster
Pinus ponderosa
Pinus pumila
Pinus pungens
Pinus resinosa 
Pinus rigida 
Pinus sibirica
Pinus strobiformis
Pinus strobus
Pinus sylvestris 
Pinus sylvestris var. mongolica
Pinus tabuliformis
Pinus thunbergii
Pinus wallichiana

Flora of Denmark
Denmark